Andres Mihai Dumitrescu (born 11 March 2001) is a Romanian professional footballer who plays as a defender for Liga I side Sepsi OSK.

Club career

After spending 2019 at the youth teams of Padova and Lugano he joined Sepsi OSK in January 2020. He made his Liga I debut for Sepsi OSK against Chindia Târgoviște on 23 November 2020.

Honours
Sepsi OSK 
Cupa României: 2021–22
Supercupa României: 2022

References

External links
 
 

2001 births
Living people
Sportspeople from Slatina, Romania
Romanian footballers
Romania youth international footballers
Romania under-21 international footballers
Association football defenders
Liga I players
Liga III players
Sepsi OSK Sfântu Gheorghe players